Alexain is a commune in the Mayenne department in northwestern France. It is 20 km northwest of Laval and 14 km from Mayenne. The nearest communes are La Bigottière, Placé, and Saint-Germain-d'Anxure.

Population

Sights
The nearby Château de la Feuillée, long-term home of the d'Orenge family, was destroyed during the French Revolution and was rebuilt in 1809.

See also
Communes of Mayenne

References

Communes of Mayenne